Guilty is a 1916 American silent drama film featuring Harry Carey.

Cast
 Harry Carey
 Edith Johnson
 Lee Shumway (as Leon C. Shumway)
 Peggy Coudray
 Lee Hill
 Mark Fenton
 Edwin Wallock (as E.N. Wallack)
 Hector Sarno (as Hector V. Sarno)

See also
 Harry Carey filmography

External links

1916 films
1916 short films
American silent short films
American black-and-white films
Films directed by Henry MacRae
1916 drama films
Silent American drama films
1910s American films